The Indus Highway, also known as National Highway 55 (N-55), is a 1264 km long two to four-lane national highway that runs along the Indus River in Pakistan connecting the port city of Karachi with the northwestern city of Peshawar via Dera Ghazi Khan. It is part of Pakistan's National Highways network and is maintained and operated by Pakistan's National Highway Authority. The Indus Highway passes through the Kohat Tunnel.

History 
In 1980, the Indus Highway was proposed to provide an alternative and shorter route to the heavily used N-5 and to also aid the development of western Sindh province and eastern Khyber Pakhtunkhwa province. Construction began in 1981 from Kotri and was completed in 1997 in Peshawar. Major cities it links include 

The Government of Pakistan have planned that a portion of about 300 km will be dualized by the year 2023 starting from Dera Ghazi Khan towards Kotri.
ECNEC approved a summary regarding the construction of additional two lanes and widening/rehabilitation of the existing two-lane carriageway of the Shikarpur-Rajanpur section of Indus Highway N-55, to be executed by the National Highway Authority (NHA). The project would be sponsored by the Ministry of Communications and Asian Development Bank with a total cost of Rs44.7 billion (GoP: Rs4,470.390; ADB: Rs40,233.50).

https://profit.pakistantoday.com.pk/2021/03/11/ecnec-approves-12-projects-worth-rs267-billion/

See also 
 Motorways of Pakistan
 Transport in Pakistan

References

External links
 National Highway Authority

N-55
N-55